Larkin is a suburb in Johor Bahru, Johor, Malaysia.

Geography
The suburb spans over an area of 12.3 km2.

Shopping
MB Point - Larkin Perdana (2017)

Plaza Larkin, Larkin Perdana, Terminal Larkin Sentral, Dataran Larkin

Education
 SMK St Joseph
 Sekolah Rendah Islam Husni Amal
 Sekolah Agama Dato' Onn Jaafar
 SJK(C) Food Yew 3
 SMT (ERT) Azizah
 Sekolah Kebangsaan Larkin 2
 Sekolah Kebangsaan Tanjung Puteri

Tourist attractions
 Tan Sri Dato' Haji Hassan Yunos Stadium
 Tun Hussein Onn Jamek Mosque

Transportation
 Larkin Sentral

References

Towns and suburbs in Johor Bahru District
Townships in Johor
Johor Bahru